Hansenbreen is a glacier  long, flowing north along the west side of Mount Nils Larsen in the Sør Rondane Mountains of Antarctica. It was roughly mapped by Norwegian cartographers from air photos taken by the Lars Christensen Expedition, 1936–37, and remapped by them in greater detail in 1957 from air photos taken by U.S. Navy Operation Highjump, 1946–47. It was named for Hans Edvard Hansen, a Norwegian cartographer who compiled these and other maps for Norwegian Antarctic expeditions.

See also
 List of glaciers in the Antarctic
 Glaciology

References

 

Glaciers of Queen Maud Land
Princess Ragnhild Coast